Big wall climbing is a type of rock climbing where a climber ascends a long multi-pitch route, normally requiring more than a single day to complete the climb. Big wall routes require the climbing team to live on the route often using portaledges and hauling equipment.

History 

In the early 20th century, climbers were scaling big rock faces in the Dolomites and the European Alps employing free- and aid-climbing tactics to create bold ascents. Yet, the sheer walls were waiting to be climbed by future generations with better tools and methods.

In addition, many nations in the early 1900s had specialized army units that had developed wall climbing skills for gaining surprise entry into enemy fortifications by wall climbing.  In the early 1900s the Filipino Scouts, a US Army unit composed of Filipino enlisted and American officers, demonstrated their specialized skills by climbing the steep walls of a Spanish era fortification in Manila, then bested that demonstration by climbing the same wall again only bringing a battery of mountain howitzers this time to the top of the wall.

Emilio Comici, who was the inventor and proponent of using multi-step aid ladders, solid belays, the use of a trail/tag line, and hanging bivouacs, contributed greatly to the techniques of big wall climbing. Thanks to his innovations, in the late 1950s big wall climbing finally started. 
In Yosemite, the northwest face of Half Dome was climbed in 1957 and the southeast buttress of El Capitan in 1958. With the invention of hard iron pitons, jumars and hammocks, wall climbing exploded in the 1960s and 1970s.

Following those pioneering achievements, parties began routinely setting off prepared for days and days of uninterrupted climbing on very long, hard, steep routes. The food, water, hardware and shelter necessary for such a climb could easily weigh well into the hundreds of pounds. Hauling systems were developed for managing these large loads.

In the past few decades, techniques for big wall climbing have evolved, because of a greater employment of free climbing and advances in speed climbing. The routes that used to routinely take days can be climbed in under 24 hours. Nevertheless, many parties still do make multi-day ascents of classic "trad routes" which have recently gone mostly free and very fast. Only a small handful of elite and exceptionally well-prepared climbers are capable of feats such as free-climbing the entirety of most classic Grade VI routes, or of speed-climbing such routes in a matter of hours.

Hauling 
In order to haul portaledges and other gear such as ropes, food, and water up a rock face, the gear is put in a bag ("haul bag" or "pig") and pulled up to the next belay station.  There are many different mechanically advantageous systems, such as counterweighting, that are utilized to make pulling up the "haul bag" easier than simply dragging it up the face.

Gear is usually spread over many haul bags (usually packed so that they weigh between 30 and 40 kilograms) in order to maximize efficiency and limit loss of equipment if a bag is lost. The hauling system usually consists of a self-locking pulley in order to capture the motion and prevent the bag from descending once hauling stops. Next, an ascender clamped to the haul rope is used to pull the haul line through the pulley.

See also 
El Capitan (film)
Meru (film)
Free solo climbing

References

External links
How To Big Wall Climb

Types of climbing
Types of Mountaineering